The Panam GP Series is the replacement of the Mexican Formula Three Championship. In 2002 began as Mexican Formula Renault, but in 2005 started an internationalization process in Central America and North of South America. In 2008, the series fell in hiatus. Some people started the LATAM Challenge Series with the same cars. In 2012, the revival ran with Formula Abarth cars.

Venues

Champions

2000 Series

1600 Series

Panam GP Series

See also

 2015–16 NACAM Formula 4 season
 LATAM Challenge Series

References

External links

Fórmula Panam on Facebook